John Waring (13 July 1909 – 1991) was an English professional footballer who played as a winger.

References

1909 births
1991 deaths
People from Wombwell
English footballers
Association football wingers
Wombwell F.C. players
Grimsby Town F.C. players
Crewe Alexandra F.C. players
Sheffield Wednesday F.C. players
English Football League players